Look Who's Talking (foaled 26 September 1991) is a thoroughbred racehorse who surprisingly won the New Zealand Derby in 1994 with a strong finish to beat the well performed Avedon.

The son of Grosvenor only won two races in his career, a maiden race and the Group 1 New Zealand Derby. He ended his career with a record of 2 wins, 1 second and 1 third from 21 races.

Look Who's Talking was trained by Nigel Tiley, and ridden to Derby victory by Grant Cooksley.

See also

 Thoroughbred racing in New Zealand

References

1991 racehorse births
Racehorses bred in New Zealand
Racehorses trained in New Zealand
Thoroughbred family 2-b